Paulius Ivanauskas (born 14 March 1996) is a Lithuanian basketball player who last played for Vytautas Prienai-Birštonas of the Lithuanian Basketball League.

Professional career
Ivanauskas started his professional career signing with BC Prienai in 2002, being only 15 years old.

References

1987 births
Living people
BC Prienai players
People from Prienai
Point guards
BC Sakalai
BC Žalgiris-2 players
Lithuanian men's basketball players